Lincoln Hills is a neighborhood located in Columbus, Georgia. The boundaries are generally acknowledged to be Veterans Parkway to the north, Miller Road and the Columbus Metropolitan Airport to the south, I-185 to the west and Moon Road to the east.

Columbus metropolitan area, Georgia
Neighborhoods in Columbus, Georgia